Thomas Shailer Weston (3 July 1868 – 20 January 1931) was a member of the New Zealand Legislative Council from 17 June 1926 to 20 January 1931, when he committed suicide aged 62 years. He was appointed by the Reform Government.

Weston was born in Auckland on 3 July 1868. His parents were Maria Cracroft Weston (née Hill) and Thomas S. Weston, and judge and later a member of the House of Representatives for electorates on the West Coast of the South Island. Like his younger brother Claude, he was educated at Christ's College and graduated from the Canterbury University College. He graduated with B.A. (1888), M.A. first class honours in political science (1889), and LL.B. (1892).

He was for some time governor of the New Plymouth Boys' High School. He later lived in Wellington.

References

1868 births
1931 suicides
Members of the New Zealand Legislative Council
Reform Party (New Zealand) MLCs
20th-century New Zealand lawyers
University of Canterbury alumni
People educated at Christ's College, Christchurch
New Zealand politicians who committed suicide
Suicides by firearm in New Zealand
New Zealand schoolteachers
Thomas Jr